Remp-It is a 2006 Malaysian action film which focuses on the lifestyle of Malaysian motorcycle street racers, who are known locally as Mat Rempit. Produced by Metrowealth Pictures and directed by Ahmad Idham, the film premiered in August 2006.

Synopsis 
The story is about a Mat Rempit named Madi who works as a dispatch boy by day and street racer by night. As a Mat Rempit, his activities at night include street racing and performing various Mat Rempit stunts such as the wheelie, Superman, wikang, etc.

Madi has a girlfriend named Ieka who asks him to marry her after each time they have sex. But Madi only focuses on collecting his money to buy a [Yamaha 125Z], since he only owns a modified Honda EX-5 which is not very powerful enough for street racing. Madi also has a best friend named Macha who gives him information about each street race that Madi is to take part in. After paying for the motorcycle in cash, Madi and Macha modify it heavily and tune it to the maximum.

After winning many street races, a challenger named Spark comes along with his gang to challenge Madi for a pink slip race (i.e. the loser has to give his vehicle to the winner). Madi loses the race and he is supposed to give away his Yamaha 125Z to Spark as promised, but Madi instead decides to run away with Spark's Yamaha TZM 150. However, Spark and his gang managed to chase him and beat him severely. Madi is severely injured and his right leg is fractured by Spark during the fight. What's worse, his motorcycle has been destroyed by Spark and his gangs. Ieka sees the incident and turns to Spark and his gang.

Six months later, Madi is no longer a dispatch boy. He is now working as a mechanic in a motorcycle workshop. One day, an underling of Spark's comes to the workshop and is beaten by Madi. After beating him, Madi asks Spark's underling for a one-make rematch race with the Yamaha RX-Z. Then Macha meets Madi at the workshop and brings him to Wazi's place to buy his Yamaha RX-Z. With the second-hand motorcycle bought from Wazi, Madi begins modifying and practising with the bike once he has fully recovered.

The time for the final showdown arrives. Madi, Spark and several other Mat Rempits races along Shah Alam Expressway. Some of the Mat Rempits crash at a toll plaza while others crash at the motorcycle lane along the expressway, leaving only Madi and Spark. After a fierce challenge along the Shah Alam Expressway, Spark plays a cheap shot - he kicks Madi, causing him to skid under a lorry and die after hitting his head on a road barrier. Spark, however, escapes.

The movie ends here, but during the ending credits of the movie, it is revealed that Spark has finally been arrested and jailed by the police. Meanwhile, Macha has quit being a Mat Rempit and married Ieka as a result of the tragedy that caused him to lose his best friend.

Characters 
 Madi (Cast: Farid Kamil) - The protagonist of the story. A famous Mat Rempit who lost to Spark in a street race and prepares for a payback during the final race at Shah Alam Expressway.
 Spark (Cast: Zul Huzaimy) - Another famous Mat Rempit which is Madi's main arch-enemy. After he wins against Madi, he beats Madi severely and burns down Madi's Yamaha Y125Z when Madi decides to run away when he has lost the race.
 Macha (Cast: Cat Farish) - Madi's best friend which is also another Mat Rempit.
 Ieka (Cast: Julia Hana) - A prostitute (bohsia) who at first appears as Madi's girlfriend but later turns to Spark's gangs.
 Rizzo (Cast: Aqasha) - An old friend of Macha and a member of Spark's TZM crew. However, he does not race in the movie but prefers to convoy. Rizzo always tries to make a move on Ieka.

Featured motorcycles 
 Honda C70 - Macha's bike.
 Yamaha 125Z - Used by most Mat Rempits. Madi's second motorcycle which was later destroyed by Spark.
 Honda EX-5 - Used by most Mat Rempits. Madi's first motorcycle which was modified with a front disc brake.
 Yamaha TZM 150 - Used by Spark and his gangs.
 Yamaha RX-Z - Madi's third motorcycle. Used by Mat Rempits during the final challenge along Shah Alam Expressway.
 Suzuki GSX-R1000 - Used by Wazi Abdul Hamid.

Special appearance 
 David Teo (producer) and Ahmad Idham (director) both appeared as the motorcycle shop owner and the mechanic respectively at the motorcycle shop where Madi buys his Yamaha Y125Z.
 A Malaysian professional motorcycle racer, Wazi Abdul Hamid made a special appearance as the owner of a Yamaha RX-Z who sold his bike to Madi. In addition, many former Mat Rempits were involved for the stunts in the movie.

See also 
 Mat Rempit
 Street racing
 Yamaha Y125Z

External links
 Remp-It at filemkita.com (Malaysian movie database)

2006 films
Malay-language films
Malaysian action films
Metrowealth Pictures films
Films directed by Ahmad Idham
Films produced by David Teo
2006 action films